The FCA Global Small Engine (or GSE, marketed as FireFly) is a new family of engines produced by Fiat Chrysler Automobiles or (FCA) starting in 2016, and subsequently Stellantis, gradually replacing the FIRE (including MultiAir versions) and SGE (TwinAir) units.

It is a modular design (thus, inline-3 and inline-4 guises share the same unitary displacement and components such as pistons and connecting rods, so are able to be produced on the same production line), with aluminum cylinder heads and blocks and 77.0mm cylinder bore spacing for all types.

It was introduced in 2016 in simple naturally aspirated, 2-valve per cylinder with VVT, indirect injected, flex-fuel 1.0 inline-3 and 1.3 inline-4 versions for the South American market under the hood of the 2017 Brazilian Fiat Uno.

Next, it was introduced in 2018 to European and North American markets, in turbocharged, 4-valve per cylinder, direct-injected and MultiAir III versions, under the hood of the 2019 Jeep Renegade and Fiat 500X facelifts.

Next, it was introduced in 2020 to European and North American markets, in MHEV, 4-valve per cylinder and direct-injected versions, under the hood of the 2020 Fiat 500, Fiat Panda (319) and Lancia Ypsilon (846).



Applications

South America

Europe/North America

See also
 MultiAir
 Fully Integrated Robotised Engine FIRE engine
 JTD engine
 List of engines used in Chrysler products

References

Fiat engines
Straight-three engines
Straight-four engines
Gasoline engines by model